Isidoro de María (1815–1906) was a Uruguayan writer, historian, journalist, politician and diplomat.

In 1833 he married Sinforosa Navarrete Artigas (a relative of José Gervasio Artigas) with whom he fathered several children, among others, writer and politician Pablo de María and folklorist poet Alcides de María.

Among other works he wrote:
Vida del Brigadier General José Gervasio Artigas fundador de la Nacionalidad Oriental (1860)
Tradiciones y recuerdos. Montevideo antiguo, four volumes published between 1887 and 1895
Compendio de la Historia de la República Oriental del Uruguay (editor).

References

1815 births
1906 deaths
Writers from Montevideo
Uruguayan male writers
19th-century Uruguayan historians
Uruguayan journalists
Uruguayan politicians
Uruguayan diplomats
Uruguayan people of Italian descent